"Loving Every Minute" is a 1996 song by British duo Lighthouse Family, released as the fourth and final single from their debut album Ocean Drive (1996). The song was produced by Mike Peden. It was released in November 1996 and reached the top 20 in the United Kingdom. It was remixed by Cutfather & Joe for its single release, adding a drum beat and a slightly different introduction.

Critical reception
British magazine Music Week rated the song three out of five, adding, "With more soul and less pop than its predeccessors, this is not as instant as Lifted, but will undoubtedly let the duo round off the year with another hit."

Chart performance
After the release of "Loving Every Minute", the single reached #20, which meant that it was their fourth successive top 20 hit since their first re-release single of "Lifted" in February 1996. The song stayed on the UK Singles Chart for 7 weeks.

As well as being in the UK Singles Chart, "Loving Every Minute" also went into the Sweden Singles Chart, peaking at #50 in March 1997 and stayed in the charts for 3 weeks.

"Loving Every Minute" also went into the Eurochart Hot 100. The single peaked at #62 in December 1996 and stayed in the charts for 3 weeks.

Track listing
 UK CD1
 "Loving Every Minute" (Cutfather & Joe Remix) — 4:14
 "Sweetest Operator" (Live) — 7:41
 "Beautiful Night" (Live) — 5:26
 "Ocean Drive" (Live Acoustic Encore) — 3:33

 UK CD2
 "Loving Every Minute" (Cutfather & Joe Remix) — 4:19
 "Loving Every Minute" (Album Version) — 4:11
 "Loving Every Minute" (Cutfather & Joe Alternative Mix) — 4:19
 "Loving Every Minute" (Cutfather & Joe Instrumental) — 4:17

 UK Cassette
 "Loving Every Minute" (Cutfather & Joe Remix) — 4:19
 "Loving Every Minute" (Album Version) — 4:11

Charts

References

External links
Official Charts Company - UK chart performance of Lighthouse Family's "Loving Every Minute"
Sweden Chart performance of Lighthouse Family's "Loving Every Minute"
Eurochart Hot 100 which shows the peak position of Lighthouse Family's "Loving Every Minute"

1996 singles
Lighthouse Family songs
Songs written by Paul Tucker (musician)
Songs written by Martin Brammer
1995 songs
Songs written by Tunde Baiyewu